Cao Bá Quát (1809–1855) was a Vietnamese poet and revolutionary who led a peasant uprising against Emperor Tự Đức.  He was either executed or killed in battle.  Many of his poems were destroyed, but about 1400 (most written in Han Tu) survive. His poems treat Buddhism sceptically.

Biography
Cao Bá Quát, a nineteenth-century literatus, was born in the year 1809 in Phu Thi Village  That time period belonged to the Nguyễn dynasty under the regime of King Minh Mang, Thieu Tri, and Tu Duc. At a young age, Cao Bao Quat exhibited intelligence that exceeded his age group; by the age of five, he was able to read the Tam Tu Kinh. Cao Tuu Chieu, his father, was a Confucian and teacher

It had been part of his family tradition to enroll in the competition-examination to gain a position in the mandarin. In 1831, Cao Ba Quat entered the Thi Huong examinations, which was held in Hanoi. Initially he was ranked second among the prosperous candidates, but after his exam was reviewed by the Court, it was declared that he had failed due to violating examination rules. There was a mandatory stylistic and parameters that were to be followed by the candidates and it has been speculated that Cao Ba Quat was unable to follow the four forms of writing known as Chan, Thao, Trien, Le.

Cao Bá Quát's talent did not go unnoticed; after 10 years of consecutive failures, Cao Bá Quát was called to the capital Hue. By the recommendation of Bac Ninh Province's governor, Cao Bao Quat was appointed as a low-rank mandarin in the Ministry of Rites and became the primary examiner in the Thua Thien Examination Compound.  Cao Bá Quát held that position for a short period of time; while marking exam papers that held potential, Cao Bao Quat had adjusted their content as they contained tabooed names. This information was disclosed and Cao Bao Quat lost his post and exiled to Da Nang. After his mission to Singapore led by Dao Tri Phu, Cao Bá Quát was rehabilitated and earned the position of Agency Director at the Court. In 1847, he was invited to the Academy of Hue Court.

Cao Bá Quát was well known for his eccentric personality; he chose to continue to live a poor lifestyle and wore battered clothing. Through his literature work, Cao Bá Quát expressed his discontent on how the dignity of humans was at loss caused by society's desire for fame and fortune. Emperor Tự Đức was a knowledgeable literature himself and had recognized Cao Bao Quat for his expertise. Emperor Tự Đức's affliction with Cao Bá Quát was an ongoing battle; as disgraceful and arrogant Cao Bao Quat was, Emperor Tu Duc did not hide his admiration for him.

Cao Bá Quát continued his rebellion against Emperor Tự Đức and his court through his poems that was circulated amongst the weak and vulnerable.  In 1855, Cao Bá Quát was mandated to combat in the Yên Sơn District. The controversy of Cao Bao Quat's death is a debate until this day. It has been noted that Cao Bá Quát died during battle, but it has been theorized his death may have been deliberated due to his defiance against the Emperor. Due to Cao Bá Quát's failure in battle, Emperor Tự Đức ordered to execute all generations of his family. Cao Bá Quát is a revolutionist that has gained respect by many due to his indomitable attitude.

Relatives

References

1809 births
1853 deaths
Vietnamese male poets
Vietnamese Confucianists
Nguyễn dynasty poets
19th-century Vietnamese calligraphers